Vladimir Grosu (born 21 June 1975) is a Moldovan jurist and politician. He served as Minister of Justice from 18 February 2015 to 30 July 2015.

From 2006 to 2011, he was representative of the Government of Moldova at the European Court of Human Rights.

References 

Living people
1975 births
Place of birth missing (living people)
Moldovan Ministers of Justice
21st-century Moldovan politicians